Ligia oceanica, the sea slater, common sea slater, or sea roach, is a littoral zone woodlouse, living on rocky seashores of the European North Sea and Atlantic coastlines.

Its colour may vary from grey to olive green, and it has large compound eyes and long antennae, two-thirds as long as its body.

L. oceanica is found in temperate waters from Norway to the Mediterranean Sea, and from Cape Cod north to Maine. It is a common species, occurring wherever the substrate of the littoral zone is rocky, and is especially common in crevices and rock pools and under stones. It is a nocturnal omnivore, eating many kinds of seaweed, diatoms, and detritus, with a particular fondness for bladder wrack (Fucus vesiculosus).

L. oceanica individuals live for 2–3 years and usually breed only once.

Genome

The mitochondrial genome of L. oceanica was sequenced in 2006. It is a circular, double-stranded DNA molecule, with a size of 15,289 base pairs. Although gene order is not conserved among isopods, L. oceanica shows a similarly derived gene order to Idotea balthica, compared to the arthropod ground pattern, but the positions of three tRNA genes differ in the two isopod species.

See also
List of woodlice of the British Isles

References

External links
 
 
 

Woodlice
Crustaceans of the Atlantic Ocean
Crustaceans described in 1767
Taxa named by Carl Linnaeus